MediaCorp Channel 8's television series Super Senior is a family drama series produced by MediaCorp Singapore in 2015. This show is about a group of golden-agers who find renewed meaning to their lives in their golden years and reach out to pursue their dreams, bringing light to the people around them.

As of 15 July 2015, all 20 episodes of Super Senior have been aired on MediaCorp Channel 8.

Episodic guide

See also
List of MediaCorp Channel 8 Chinese drama series (2010s)
Super Senior

References

Lists of Singaporean television series episodes